is a Japanese actor, voice actor and narrator from Iwate Prefecture who works for Aoni Production. Among his other roles, he has performed the characters Ippon-Matsu and Gorousei (One Piece), Zaku (Fist of the North Star) and Kinnikuman Big Body (Kinnikuman: Scramble for the Throne).

Filmography

Television animation
1980s
Armored Trooper Votoms (1983) (Police (C))
Gu Gu Ganmo (1984) (Leo, Little Bird Store)
Video Warrior Laserion (1984) (Joe, Zaki)
Blue Comet SPT Layzner (1985) (Clayton) 
Fist of the North Star (1985) (Zaku, Giji, Red Ribbon's Military Soldier others)
GeGeGe no Kitarō (1985) (Kasha, Werewolf, others)
High School! Kimengumi (1985) (Soreike Minna, Tatsurō Hirōka, others) 
Mobile Suit Zeta Gundam (1985) (Haifan) 
Dragon Ball (1986) (Man Wolf, Piano, others) 
Saint Seiya (1986) (Hydra Ichi and Sea Serpent) 
Wonder Beat Scramble (1986) (Doctor Gabor) 
Akakage (1987) (Genta's father)
Bikkuriman (1987) (Urashi Maijin, Hyōzansuke, others) 
Transformers: The Headmasters (1987) (Abominus, Groove, Hardhead, Jazz, Slag, Slingshot, Trypticon, Wideload) 
Fist of the North Star 2 (1987) (Zorba)
Sakigake!! Otokojuku (1987) (Ippei Tazawa)
Kiteretsu Daihyakka (1988) (Sasaki-sensei, Sasaki-sensei's Father, Tom, Tongaripapa (Third), Alien, others)
Transformers: Super God Masterforce (1988) (Turter, King Poseidon, Phoenix, Diner Owner (episode 24)) 
Dragon Ball Z (1989) (Oguri. Police officer, others) 
Transformers: Victory (1989) (Kakuryu, Drillhorn, Doctor Minakaze) 
1990s
Oishinbo (1990) (Motoyoshi Mikawa, Employee (A))
Armored Police Metal Jack (1991) (Offender) 
Goldfish Warning! (1991) (Doctor Ohashi (Second)) 
Kinnikuman: Kinnikusei Ōi Sōdatsu-hen (1991) (Announcer Sekiguchi, God of Powerful, Kinnikuman Big Body/Strongman, King The 100 Ton (Episode 4), Bikeman, Chōjin Enma) 
Future GPX Cyber Formula (1991) (Smith) 
Matchless Raijin-Oh (1991) (Uchida Official) 
Dragon Quest: Dai no Daibōken (1991) (Bartos) 
Trapp Family Story (1991) (Hans) 
Ghost Sweeper Mikami (1993) (Schwartz) 
Slam Dunk (1993) (Koike (first)) 
Tama and Friends (1994) (Otsubo-sensei)
Tico of the Seven Seas (1994) (Crew) 
Marmalade Boy (1994) (Gen Kitahara)
Slayers (1995) (Demia and Zolf) 
Neighborhood Story (1996)
Famous Dog Lassie (1996) (Heins) 
Hell Teacher Nūbē (1997) (Youkai Piano, Makuragaeshi)
Mashin Eiyuden Wataru (1997) (Tobiderun) 
Yu-Gi-Oh! (1998) (Karita) 
Shin Hakkenden (1999) (Aori) 
2000s
One Piece (2000) (Ippon-Matsu and Gorousei)
Hiwou War Chronicles (2001) (Murakami)
Stellvia (2003) (Reshio Sulijet) 
Detective Conan (2003) (Masaru Saruhashi, Terafumi Kasuga)
Slam Dunk (2003) (Laura's Father) 
Monster (2004) (Kunz) 
GeGeGe no Kitarō (2007) (Abura-sumashi)
Dennō Coil (2007) (Doctor)
Tytania (2008) (Salomon) 
2010s
Dragon Ball Kai (2010) (Oldman Tsuno)
Crayon Shin-chan (2016) (Sakuzō Yoneda)
Nintama Rantarō (2017) (Hiranosuke Inadera (Second))
atime: Born Dragon Note (2017) (Muhammad Athhar Arsaputra)

OVA
Legend of the Galactic Heroes (1988) (Moore)
Transformers: Zone (1990) (Star Cloud, King Poseidon, Menasor)
Dai Yamato Zero-go (2004) (X-2)

Theatrical animation
Odin: Photon Sailer Starlight (1985) (Chosuke Ohtsuka) 
Toki no Tabibito -Time Stranger- (1986) (Ishida Mitsunari)
Royal Space Force: The Wings of Honnêamise (1987) (Kharock)
Akira (1988) (Takeyama)
Mobile Suit Gundam F91 (1991) (Pilot)
Dragon Ball Z: Cooler's Revenge (1991) (Naise)

Video games
Ys III: Wanderers from Ys (1991) (Gardner)
Xenosaga Episode I (2002) (Moriyama) 
Dragon Ball: Revenge of King Piccolo (2009) (Piano) 
Ryū ga Gotoku 5 (2012) (Sakurai)

Tokusatsu
Ninpuu Sentai Hurricaneger (2002) (Lingering Summerheat Ninja Bero-Tan (ep. 29))
Mahou Sentai Magiranger (2005) (Hades Warrior God Toad (eps. 35 - 44))
Ultraman Max (Auto Maton (ep. 38 - 39))
Engine Sentai Go-onger (2008) (Savage Water Barbaric Machine Beast Bombe Banki (ep. 7))

Drama CDs
Hana Yori mo Hana no Gotoku (????) (Norito's father)

Dubbing
The Empire Strikes Back (1980 Movie theater edition) (Commander Nemet)
Thomas & Friends (1995-1998) (George)

References

External links
Official agency profile 

1955 births
Living people
Aoni Production voice actors
Japanese male stage actors
Japanese male video game actors
Japanese male voice actors
Japanese theatre directors
Male voice actors from Iwate Prefecture
Tama Art University alumni
20th-century Japanese male actors
21st-century Japanese male actors